Montserrat Marin (born 5 October 1968) is a Spanish handball player. She competed in the women's tournament at the 1992 Summer Olympics.

References

External links
 

1968 births
Living people
Spanish female handball players
Olympic handball players of Spain
Handball players at the 1992 Summer Olympics
Sportspeople from Madrid
Handball players from the Community of Madrid